Pakistan competed at the 1964 Summer Olympics in Tokyo, Japan. 41 competitors, all men, took part in 29 events in 7 sports. This time round, they won a silver medal in the men's field hockey team competition.

Medalists

Silver medal in the men's field hockey team competition

Athletics

Men's 100 metres

 Iftikhar Shah
 1st round heat G; 11.4 (→ did not advance)

Men's 400 metres

 Mohammad Sadiq
 1st round heat D; 47.3 (→ advanced to 2nd round)
 2nd round heat A; 48.0 (→ did not advance)

Men's 800 metres

 Anar Khan
 1st round heat B; 1:56.4 (→ did not advance)

Men's 1500 metres

 Anar Khan
 1st round heat C; 3:56.7 (→ did not advance)

Men's 110 metres hurdles

 Ghulam Raziq
 1st round heat B; 14.7 (→ did not advance)

Men's 400 metres hurdles

 Manzoor-ul-Haq Awan
 1st round heat C; 55.3 (→ did not advance)

Men's long jump

 Iftikhar Shah
 Qualification round; Disqualified -- all three jumps not measured

Men's marathon

 Mohammad Yousuf
 2:40.46.0 finished 48th out of 58

Boxing

Men's lightweight (up to 60 kg)

 Ghulam Sarwar
 Series No 2; Beat Jacques Cotot (FRA) on pts
 Series No 3; Lost to James Vincent McCourt (IRL) on pts

Men's middleweight (up to 75 kg)

 Sultan Mahmood
 Series No 2; Lost to Valery Popenchenko (USSR) RSC 1st rd

Men's light heavyweight (up to 81 kg)

 Barkat Ali
 Series No 1; Lost to Robert H Christopherson (USA) on pts

Men's heavyweight (over 81 kg)

 Abdul Rehman
 Series No 2; Lost to Hans Huber (GER) KO 1st rd

Cycling

Men's 1,000 metres time trial

 Muhammad Hafeez
 Final classification; 1:18.50 (45.859 km/h) 23rd out of 25

Men's 4,000 metres team pursuit race

 Mohammad Ashiq, Lal Bux, Muhammad Hafeez and Muhammad Shafi
 Elimination heats race No 7; 5:38.77 (42.506 km/h) Lost to Preeda Chullamondhol, Somchai Chantarasamriti and Smaisuk Krisansuwan (THAI)

Men's 4,000 metres individual pursuit race

 Mohammad Ashiq
 Elimination heats race No 12; Disqualified as Antonio Duque Garza (MEX) Wbp (Won by pursuing)

Men's scratch sprint race

 Muhammad Hafeez
 Heats race No 3; Lost to Sergio Bianchetto (ITA)
 Repechages elimination race No 7; Lost to Peder Pedersen (DEN)

Hockey

Men's Team Competition

Pool A first round league

 Defeated  (1-0)
 Defeated  (5-2)
 Defeated  (1-0)
 Defeated  (6-0)
 Defeated  (2-0)
 Defeated  (2-1)

Semifinals

 Defeated  (3-0)

Final

Pakistan won the silver medal

Team Roster

 Manzoor Hussain Atif (captain)
 Anwar Khan (vice-captain)
 Abdul Hameed (gk)
 Mazhar Hussain (gk)
 Munir Dar
 Tariq Aziz
 Saeed Anwar
 Zafar Hayat
 Muhammad Rashid
 Zafar Ahmed Khan
 Mohammad Asad Malik
 Muhammad Manna
 Motiullah
 Khawaja Zakauddin
 Tariq Niazi
 Khizar Nawaz Bajwa
 Khalid Mahmood
 Khurshid Azam

Shooting

Four shooters represented Pakistan in 1964.

25 m pistol
 Hav Abdur Rashid
 269/269 = 538 score finished 49th out of 53

50 m pistol
 Abdul Salam Muhammad
 87/81/86/77/88/88 = 507 score finished 46th out of 52

50 m rifle, three positions
 Aziz Ahmed Chaudhry
 376/352/312 = 1040 score finished 50th out of 53

50 m rifle, prone
 Aziz Ahmed Chaudhry
 93/96/96/90/95/97 = 567 score finished 73rd out of 73

Trap
 Mohiuddin Khawaja
 17/3/12/13/16/12/8/10 = 91 score finished 51st out of 51

Weightlifting

Men's bantamweight (56 kg)

 Mohammad Azam Mian
 Press 87.5 kg
 Snatch 87.5 kg
 Jerk 120.0 kg
 Total 295.0kg (finished 20th out of 24)

Wrestling

Men's flyweight (52 kg)

 Mohammad Niaz
 1st round; Drew with Said Aliakbar Haydari (IRN)
 2nd round; Beat Athanasios Zafiropoulos (GRE)
 3rd round; Beat Stoytcho Malov Georgiev (BUL)
 4th round; Lost to Chang Sun Chang (KOR)

Men's bantamweight (57 kg)

 Siraj Din
 1st round; Beat Walter Pilling (GBR)
 2nd round; Beat Karl Dodrimont (GER)
 3rd round; Lost to Yojiro Uetake (JPN)

Men's featherweight (63 kg)

 Mohammad Akhtar
 1st round; Lost to Nodar Khokhashvili (USSR)
 2nd round; Lost to Stantcho Kolev Ivanov (BUL)

Men's lightweight (70 kg)

 Mohammad Bashir
 1st round; Beat Stefanos Ioannidis (GRE)
 2nd round; Lost to Zarbegi Beriashvili (USSR)
 3rd round; Lost to Mahmut Atalay (TUR) by fall

Men's welterweight (78 kg)

 Muhammad Afzal
 1st round; Lost to Karoly Bajko (HUN)
 2nd round; Beat Byung-Sup Choi (KOR)
 3rd round; Beat Perko A Dermendjiev (BUL)
 4th round; Lost to Mohamad-Ali Sanatkaran (IRN) by default

Men's middleweight (87 kg)

 Faiz Muhammad
 1st round; Beat Alfonso Rafael Gonzalez (PAN)
 2nd round; Drew with Doo-Man Kang (KOR)
 3rd round; Lost to Geza Hollosi (HUN)
 4th round; Lost to Daniel Oliver Brand (USA) by fall

References

External links
Official Olympic Reports
International Olympic Committee results database

Nations at the 1964 Summer Olympics
1964 Summer Olympics
1964 in Pakistani sport